Ghazi Jeribi (born 5 December 1955) is a Tunisian politician. He served as Minister of Defence in the cabinet of Prime Minister Mehdi Jomaa. He also served as Minister of Justice in the cabinet of Prime Minister Youssef Chahed.

References 

Living people
1955 births
People from Tunis
21st-century Tunisian politicians
Government ministers of Tunisia
Justice ministers of Tunisia
Defence ministers of Tunisia